The 2022 Stan Nagaiah Trophy was a Twenty20 International (T20I) cricket tournament which was held in Singapore in June 2022. The annual Stan Nagaiah Trophy was first contested between Malaysia and Singapore in 1995. This was the first time that the series had been contested since 2018, and the first to be played with T20I status.

The series, played at the Indian Association Ground, provided Singapore with preparation for the 2022 ICC Men's T20 World Cup Global Qualifier B, while Malaysia followed this series by hosting a quadrangular series in July 2022.

Malaysia came from behind after losing the opening match to win the series 2–1. In the final match, which was reduced to 13 overs per side due to rain, player of the match Sharvin Muniandy struck three consecutive sixes in his 26 not out to win the game for Malaysia.

Squads

T20I series

1st T20I

2nd T20I

3rd T20I

References

External links
 Series home at ESPN Cricinfo

Associate international cricket competitions in 2022
Stan Nagaiah Trophy